Thomson is a patronymic surname meaning "son of Thom, Thomp, Thompkin, or other diminutive of Thomas", itself derived from the Aramaic תום or Tôm, meaning "twin". The surname is documented in Cheshire records before and after the 1066 Norman Conquest.  Variations include Thomason, Thomasson, Thomerson, Thomoson, and others. The French surname Thomson is first documented in Burgundy and is the shortened form for Thom[as]son, Thom[es]son. Variations include Thomassin, Thomason, Thomsson, Thomesson, Thomeson, and others.  Thomson is uncommon as a given name.

List of persons with the surname

Disambiguation of common given names with this surname
 Thomson Rodrigues
 Adam Thomson (disambiguation)
 Andrew Thomson (disambiguation)
 David Thomson (disambiguation)
 Edward Thomson (disambiguation)
 Ian Thomson (disambiguation) 
 James Thomson (disambiguation)
 John Thomson (disambiguation)
 Julius Thomson (disambiguation)
 Richard Thomson (disambiguation)
 William Thomson (disambiguation)

Arts and letters
 Alexander Thomson (1817–1875), Scottish architect
 Beatrix Thomson (1900–1986), British actress
 Beverly Thomson (born 1966), Canadian journalist
 Charles Thomson (artist) (born 1953), British artist, painter and poet
 Cyndi Thomson (born 1976), American country music singer
 Edward William Thomson (writer) (1849–1924), Canadian journalist and writer
 Frederick Clifton Thomson (1890–1928), American silent film cowboy actor
 George Thomson (musician) (1757–1821), Scottish music collector
 Hugh Thomson (1860–1920), Irish illustrator
 Hugh Thomson (writer), English travel writer 
 Kenneth Thomson (actor) (1899–1967), American character actor
 Lily James (born Lily Thomson in 1989), English actress
 Margaret Thomson (1910–2005), Australian-New Zealand filmmaker 
 R. H. Thomson (b. 1947), Canadian television, film, and stage actor
 Riley Thomson (1912–1960), American animator and comics artist
 Robert James Thomson, Australian journalist
 Roy Thomson, 1st Baron Thomson of Fleet (1894–1976), Canadian newspaper and media entrepreneur
 Rosemary Thomson, Canadian conductor
 Rupert Thomson (b 1955), English author
 Sebastian Thomson, drummer and musician
 Tom Thomson (1877–1917), Canadian artist
 Valentine Thomson (1881–1944) French writer, philanthropist and women's rights activist
 Virgil Thomson (1896–1989), American composer

Politics, law, and government
 Charles Thomson, secretary of the Continental Congress
 Charles Poulett Thomson, 1st Baron Sydenham (1799–1841), first Governor of the united Province of Canada
 Craig Thomson (politician), Australian politician
 Edwin Keith Thomson (1919–1960), member of the U.S. House of Representatives
 Edward William Thomson (1794–1865), member of the 13th Parliament of Upper Canada
 Gaston Thomson (1848–1932), French politician
 Kelvin Thomson, Australian politician
 Lodewijk Thomson (1869–1914), Dutch soldier and politician
 Meldrim Thomson, Jr., New Hampshire governor
 Michelle Thomson, Scottish National Party politician and member of Parliament
 Michael Thomson (judge), Manitoba judge
 Roy Hendry Thomson (1932–2009), businessman, public servant and political activist
Susan Thomson (born 1962) Canadian human rights lawyer and professor of peace and conflict studies
 Thyra Thomson (1916–2013), Secretary of State of Wyoming
 Vernon Wallace Thomson (1905–1988), American politician

Sciences and medicine
 Arthur Landsborough Thomson (1890–1977), Scottish ornithologist
 Carl Gustaf Thomson (1824–1899), Swedish entomologist.
 Charles Wyville Thomson (1830–1882), professor of zoology and chief scientist on the Challenger expedition
 Donald Thomson (1901–1970), Australian anthropologist and ornithologist
 Elihu Thomson (1853–1937), English engineer, founder of what became the French firm Thomson SA
 G. Thomson (1760–1806), English geologist who worked in Italy and discovered the Widmanstätten figures
 George Paget Thomson (1892–1975), English physicist who worked on the wave nature of the electron (son of J. J. Thomson)
 J. J. Thomson (Sir Joseph John Thomson, 1856–1940), English physicist who discovered the electron
 Joseph Thomson (explorer) (1858–1895), a Scottish geologist
 Reginald H. Thomson (1856–1949), Seattle civil engineer
 Robert Thomson (inventor) (1822–1873), Scottish inventor
 Thomas Thomson jr. (1817–1878), Scottish botanist
 Thomas Thomson sr. (1773–1852), Scottish chemist
 William Thomson, 1st Baron Kelvin (1824–1907), British physicist

Sports
 Akiko Thomson (born 1974), Filipina television host, journalist and retired swimmer
 Alexander Aird Thomson (1917–1991), Scottish chess master
 Billy Thomson (footballer, born 1958), Scottish football goalkeeper
 Billy Thomson (footballer, fl. 1891–1900), Scottish football winger
 Bob Thomson, English footballer
 Bobby Thomson (1923–2010), Scottish-born American baseball player
 Brandon Thomson, South African rugby union player
 Brent Thomson (born 1958), New Zealand jockey
 Cammy Thomson (1948–1996), Scottish footballer
 Craig Thomson, Scottish footballer
 Craig Thomson, Scottish football referee
 Darran Thomson, Scottish footballer
 Des Thomson (born 1942), New Zealand cyclist
 Edmund Thomson (1874–1914), English cricketer
 Fergus Thomson, a Scottish rugby player
 Florence Frankland Thomson (1885–1939), Scottish chess player
 Gary Thomson, Irish cyclist
 Ian Thomson (cricketer) (1929–2021), English cricketer
 J. M. Archer Thomson (1863–1913), British rock-climber and mountaineer
 Jason Thomson, Scottish footballer
 Jeff Thomson (born 1950), Australian cricketer
 Kathryn Thomson (born 1996), British short track skater
 Keith Thomson (sportsman), New Zealand cricketer
 Ken Thomson (footballer), Scottish footballer
 Kenny Thomson (born 1951), Scottish footballer
 Kevin Thomson, Scottish footballer 
 Lawrie Thomson, Scottish footballer 
 Matthew Thomson (sport shooter), small-bore rifle champion
 Peter Thomson, Australian professional golfer
 Rob Thomson, Canadian baseball manager
 Robert Thomson (1875–1954), Scottish professional golfer

Other
 Edward Thomson, bishop in the Methodist Episcopal Church
 Iain Donald Thomson, American philosopher
 Judith Jarvis Thomson (1929–2020), American moral philosopher
 Kenneth Thomson, 2nd Baron Thomson of Fleet (1923–2006)
 Mowbray Thomson (1832–1917), British Army officer and author
 Douglas Thomson White aka Doogie White (born 1960), Scottish rock singer
 John Turnbull Thomson, British engineer who lived in Singapore and New Zealand
 Mick Thomson, American musician, known as the guitar in heavy metal band Slipknot

In fiction
 Thomson, one of two identical detectives in the Adventures of Tintin series by Hergé

See also
 Thomson (taxonomic authority)
 Thompson (surname)

References

English-language surnames
Patronymic surnames
Scottish surnames
Surnames from given names